This article lists x86-compliant microprocessors sold by VIA Technologies, grouped by technical merits: cores within same group have much in common.

Cyrix design (Cyrix III) 
 All models support: MMX, 3DNow!

Centaur Technology design

Cyrix III, C3 
 All models support: MMX, 3DNow!

C3, C7 
 All models support: MMX, SSE
 SSE2, SSE3, NX bit supported by Esther (C5J)

Nano 

 See List of Nano microprocessors

CHA 

 Currently in development. Details listed below are subject to change,
 8 cores + "NCORE" neural processor for AI acceleration.
 supports: MMX SSE SSE2 SSE3 SSSE3 SSE4.1 SSE4.2 AES AVX  AVX2  FMA3 SHA AVX512 AVX512F AVX512CD AVX512BW AVX512DQ AVX512VL AVX512IFMA AVX512VBMI.

See also 
 List of VIA C3 microprocessors
 List of VIA C7 microprocessors
 List of VIA Eden microprocessors
 List of VIA Nano microprocessors

References

External links 
 Via C3 product page
 Via C7 product page 
 Via Nano product page 

VIA